Türkiye Kömür İşletmeleri Soma Linyit Spor Kulübü, shortly TKİ Soma Linyitspor, colloquially known as Soma Linyitspor, is a Turkish football club located in Manisa. The world "linyit" means brown coal in Turkish language, which commemorates coal mining industry in city of Manisa. The club enjoyed their best performances while competing at TFF Second League, then-second tier league competition in Turkish football league system.

Since 2001, the club competes at Manisa Amateur League.

History

The club was founded in 1984 as Ege Linyitspor and its name was altered in 1989 as Soma Linyitspor. Beating Erzincanspor by 1–0 final score at Samsun 19 Mayıs Stadium at 1st Play-off Group, the team promoted to TFF Second League on 25 May 1994.

Team records

League affiliation
TFF Second League: 1994–1999
TFF Third League: 1990–1994, 1999–2001
Turkish Regional Amateur League: 1984–1990, 2001–

Honours
TFF Third League
 Play-off Winner: 1993–94

References
Notes

Citations

External links
Somaspor at TFF

Association football clubs established in 1984
1984 establishments in Turkey